Clavaric acid is a triterpenoid produced by the mushroom Hypholoma sublateritium. Clavaric acid was discovered by Merck Research Laboratories in a random screening of natural extracts. Clavaric acid is a reversible farnesyltransferase inhibitor with an IC50 of 1.3 μM.

References

Lanostanes
Triterpenes